Rubber Industry Smallholders Development Authority, abbreviated RISDA, is a Malaysian federal government agency under the Ministry of Rural Development entrusted to oversee the smallholder sector as an important production sector in the national economy. RISDA was established on 1 January 1973 under the powers passed by Parliament:- the Rubber Industry Smallholders Development Authority (RISDA) Act 1972 [Act 85] and the Rubber Industry Fund (Replanting) Ordinance 1952.

Function 
 To implement development policies and programs to ensure the growth and viability of the smallholder sector of rubber industry;
 To plan, coordinate, implement and monitor the Scheme provided and approved under the provisions of Part VI of the RISDA Act 1972;
 To provide technical services, advice, training and education programs to the smallholder sector;
 To collect and manage statistics or information necessary and maintain records relating to the smallholder sector;
 To plan and implement any other activities that may improve the social and economic well-being of smallholders;
 To ensure that the smallholder sector is modernized to improve the social and economic well-being of smallholders;
 To do any other things that enable it to perform its functions effectively or incidental to the performance of its functions.

Vision 
To be the agency of "Smallholders Development Leader"

Mision 
To build a progressive and prosperous smallholders community through farming and commercial activities.

Objective 
Minimum income of RM4000.00 monthly per smallholder family before 2020.

Quality Policy
RISDA Is committed to manage Replanting Assistance Programmes efficiently and effectively to meet the needs of small farmers.

Quality Objective
RISDA objective is creating sense of responsibility and commitment among all staffs in all offices to enhance the efficiency, effectiveness and customer's satisfaction.

References

External links 

 

1973 establishments in Malaysia
Agricultural organisations based in Malaysia
Government agencies established in 1973
Federal ministries, departments and agencies of Malaysia
Ministry of Rural Development (Malaysia)
Rubber industry in Malaysia